Voice of Wilderness is the second studio album by Finnish folk metal band Korpiklaani. It was released on 1 February 2005 through Napalm Records.

In 2019, fourteen alternative versions of the song "Beer Beer" were released as bonus tracks on the Tour Edition of the album Kulkija.

Track listing
All songs written by Jonne Järvelä.

Personnel

Members 
 Jonne Järvelä - vocals, joik, guitars
 Matti Johansson - drums, backing vocals
 Ali Määttä - percussion
 Cane - guitars, backing vocals
 Honka - guitars
 Arto Tissari - bass, backing shouts
 Hittavainen - fiddle, bagpipes, mouth harp, jouhikko, torupill

Guest musicians
 Mäkkärä - backing shouts
 Frank - backing shouts
 Virva Holtiton - kantele
 Katja Juhola - accordion

Production
 Sini-Suvi Helenius - photography
 Pekka Keskinen - cover art, photography
 Boris Stefanov - photography
 Monica Nordling - photography
 Samu Oittinen - recording, mixing, mastering, producer
 Jonne Järvelä - photography

References 

2005 albums
Korpiklaani albums
Napalm Records albums